Wang Qiao, courtesy name Zongjing, was a painter who lived in Qing dynasty China.  He was from Suzhou and was active from 1657 to 1680.  He is known for his figure paintings and paintings of flowers. A painting usually entitled Lady at a Dressing Table is one of his best-known paintings. It bears an important colophon by the early nineteenth century woman poet Zhou Qi.

References

Further reading
James Cahill, "Paintings Done for Women," Nannü: Men, Women, and Gender in China, vol.8 (2006), pp. 1–54.
James Cahill, Beauty Revealed: Images of Women in Qing Dynasty Painting. Berkeley: University of California,Berkeley Art Museum and Pacific Film Archive, pp. 96–99.
James Cahill, Pictures for Use and Pleasure: Vernacular Painting in High Qing China, Berkeley: University of California Press, 2010.
Ellen Widmer, The Beauty and the Book: Women and Fiction in Nineteenth Century China,Cambridge, Mass.: Harvard East Asia Monographs, 2006.

External links
Minneapolis Institute of Arts Video on Wang Qiao Painting "Lady at the Dressing Table"
Three Scholars Discuss Wang Qiao painting "Lady at the Dressing Table"

Painters from Suzhou
Qing dynasty painters
17th-century Chinese painters